Radio Control Tower is an  elevation nunatak located in the Southeast Fork Kahiltna Glacier valley in the Alaska Range, in Denali National Park and Preserve, in the U.S. state of Alaska. It is situated west of the Kahiltna base camp for mountaineers attempting to climb Denali or Mount Hunter. Access to the area is via air taxi from Talkeetna.

Climate

Based on the Köppen climate classification, Radio Control Tower is located in a subarctic climate zone with long, cold, snowy winters, and cool summers. Temperatures can drop below −20 °C with wind chill factors below −30 °C. The months May through June offer the most favorable weather for climbing or viewing.

References

External links

 Localized weather: Mountain Forecast

Alaska Range
Mountains of Denali National Park and Preserve
Mountains of Denali Borough, Alaska
Mountains of Alaska